The Cokossi, or Tchokossi is a traditional monarchy in northern Togo that has existed since at least the 17th century. It is also known as Anoufu.  The rulers bear the title Soma; the first ruler was Bema Bonsafo.  The current ruler is Na Bema.

List of Somas
 ?–? Bema Bonsafo
 ?–? Caba I
 ?–? Na Ba
 ?–? Siki of Tchokossi
 ?–? Na Mussa
 ?–? Jokura
 ?–1875 Marba
 1875–1882 Lafia Langbana
 1882–1883 Acuru
 The next three ruled jointly
 1883–1889 Na Da
 1884–1889 Sambiego Da
 1884–1898 Bema Sabie
 1898 Ajanda
 1898–1912 Caba II
 1912–1921 Jauna
 1921–1960? Tabi of Tchokossi
 1960?– Na Bema

References

History of Togo
Togolese politicians